The only species of Branhamella (Branhamella catarrhalis) is reclassified to Moraxella catarrhalis.

References

Moraxellaceae
Monotypic bacteria genera